The prairie warbler (Setophaga discolor) is a small songbird of the New World warbler family.

Description
These birds have yellow underparts with dark streaks on the flanks, and olive overparts with rusty streaks on the back; they have a yellow line above the eye, a dark line through it, and a yellow spot below it. These birds have black legs, long tails, two pale wing bars, and thin pointed bills. Coloring is duller in female and immatures.

Measurements

Vocalizations
Prairie warblers have two categories of songs, referred to as Type A and Type B. Type A songs are typically a series of ascending buzzy notes. The B songs are an ascending series of whistled notes that often contain some buzzy notes. Compared to A songs, the B songs are lower in pitch, have fewer, longer notes. The total song length is longer as well in Type B songs. The use of these two song categories is associated with certain contexts. A songs are sung throughout the day when males first arrive on their breeding grounds. Once males are paired they begin to sing B songs during the dawn chorus and then will intersperse A songs in their singing during the rest of the day. During this later period of singing A songs are typically used near females, near the nest, and in the center of their territories. In contrast B songs are used when interacting or fighting with other males and near the borders of their territories.

Part of their call note repertoire is a tsip call. During dawn, chorus B songs are interspersed with rapid loud "check" calls.

Distribution and habitat
These birds are permanent residents in the southern parts of their range. Other birds migrate to north-eastern Mexico and islands in the Caribbean.

Behaviour and ecology

Breeding
Their breeding habitats are brushy areas and forest edges in eastern North America. The prairie warbler's nests are open cups, which are usually placed in a low area of a tree or shrub. Incubation period is 12 to 13 days.

Feeding
Prairie warblers forage actively on tree branches, and sometimes fly around with the purpose of catching insects, which are the main food source of these birds.

Behaviour
These birds wag their tails frequently.

Status
The numbers of these birds are declining due to habitat loss; this species also suffers from nest parasitism by the brown-headed cowbird.

Gallery

References

External links

 Prairie warbler - Dendroica discolor - USGS Patuxent Bird Identification InfoCenter
 Prairie warbler species account - Cornell Lab of Ornithology
 Prairie warbler Stamps from Barbados, British Virgin Islands, Grenada, St. Kitts at bird-stamps.org
 
 
 Prairie warbler bird sound at Florida Museum of Natural History
 
 
 

prairie warbler
Native birds of the Plains-Midwest (United States)
Native birds of the Eastern United States
Birds of the Dominican Republic
prairie warbler
prairie warbler